Indiana Repertory Theatre, frequently abbreviated IRT, is a professional regional theatre in Indianapolis, Indiana that began as a genuine repertory theatre with its casts performing in multiple shows at once.  It has subsequently become a regional theatre and a member of the League of Resident Theatres.  A standard season typically consists of nine or ten plays on two different stages (with at least two selected especially although not exclusively for student audiences, one of which is often a Shakespeare play) and the bulk of its season (including a holiday show, usually Charles Dickens's A Christmas Carol) performed on the OneAmerica Stage.

The theatre company has history in two theatre buildings.   It began in 1972 in The Athenaeum.  In 1980, the IRT moved to its current home, The Indiana Theatre, a former Paramount Pictures Publix Theatre at 140 West Washington Street, built in 1927 and converted from a movie theater for IRT's use.

Past Actors and Productions

Among the better known actors that have performed multiple times at the theatre are Priscilla Lindsay, former Assistant Artistic Director, Scott Wentworth, a founding member, and John Henry Redwood, who would later pass away when touring a one-man show he premiered in 2001 at Indiana Repertory.  This show, Looking Over the President's Shoulder, was commissioned by James Still (playwright), the IRT's Playwright in Residence.  This play is the true story of Alonzo Fields, who served as a butler to three presidents of the United States.  Another playwright who has written works on IRT commissions is Charles Smith, including Les Trois Dumas and Sister Carrie, and last season's Gospel According to James.  Another actor, Johnny Lee Davenport played Deputy Marshal Henry in The Fugitive  and U.S. Marshals, as well as playing the title character in Othello.  Tim Grimm makes regular appearances in the theatre, often, but not always, as a rural sort of character.

The theatre is well known in the state for their production of Charles Dickens's A Christmas Carol as adapted by Tom Haas, a late IRT artistic director/member of the former repertory company.  It is a chamber theatre production modeled on David Edgar's The Life and Adventures of Nicholas Nickleby, that retains many of the story's darkest elements, such as the scene featuring Want and Ignorance that Dickens himself considered its heart, but is often omitted.

For the most part, the theatre stopped doing musicals in the 1990s however the IRT did produce the world premiere musical Captive Heart: The Frances Slocum Story (1999), by Jeff Hooper (book) and Bob Lucas (music and lyrics).  This musical is based on the story of Maconaquah, which is part of the standard history curriculum in Indiana, and an Indiana premiere of a musical with a book by Wentworth, Enter the Guardsman, based on the Ferenc Molnár play, The Guardsman, with music by Craig Bohmler and lyrics by Marion Adler.  The IRT has done more recent productions of Crowns (Regina Taylor), The Fantasticks (Harvey Schmidt and Tom Jones), and Stephen Sondheim's A Little Night Music starring Sylvia McNair.

IRT was the first theatre to cast an autistic actor Mickey Rowe as the lead character in the play The Curious Incident of the Dog in the Night-Time.

The theatre sponsors an Indiana playwriting competition for middle and high school aged writers, Young Playwrights in Process, funded in part by a gift from the late Robert and Margot Eccles.

Past Seasons

2016-2017

The Three Musketeers (m) 09/20/16 Dumas/Bush Woronicz, Henry
Finding Home: Indiana at 200 * (u) 10/18/16 multiple writers & Grimm Amster, Peter
A Christmas Carol (m – holiday) 11/19/16 Dickens/Haas Allen, Janet
Guess Who’s Coming to Dinner (m) 01/10/17 Rose/Kreidler Greer, Skip
The Cay (u – students & families) 01/28/17 Taylor/Cornelison Roberts, Richard
Stuart Little (cab – young children) 02/25/17 White/Robinette Walters, Lori
Boeing Boeing (m) 03/07/17 Camoletti/Cross & Evans Gordon, Laura
Miranda (u) 03/28/17 Still, James Godinez, Henry
Dial “M” for Murder (m) 04/25/17 Knott, Frederick Still, James

2015-2016

The Great Gatsby (m) 10/01/15 Fitzgerald/Levy Amster, Peter
April 4, 1968: 10/21/15 Still, James Sale, Courtney
Before We Forgot How to Dream # (u)
A Christmas Carol (m – holiday) 11/11/15 Dickens/Haas Sale, Courtney
Peter Rabbit and Me (cab – young children) 11/17/15 Potter/Harris Bable, Wendy
The Mystery of Irma Vep (u) 01/12/16 Ludlum, Charles Still, James
To Kill a Mockingbird (m – students & families) 01/26/16 Lee/Sergel Allen, Janet
Fences (m) 03/09/16 Wilson, August Bellamy, Lou
Bridge & Tunnel (u) 03/29/16 Jones, Sarah Roberts, Richard
The Mousetrap (m) 04/26/16 Christie, Agatha Sale, Courtney

2014-2015

The Two Gentlemen of Verona (m) 09/16/14 Shakespeare, William Ocel, Tim
Red (u) 10/14/14 Logan, John Still, James
A Christmas Carol (m – holiday) 11/13/14 Dickens/Haas Sale, Courtney
The Velveteen Rabbit (cab – young children) 11/18/14 Still, James/Williams North, Carol
Good People (m) 01/07/15 Lindsay-Abaire, David Allen, Janet
The Giver (u – students & families) 01/23/15 Lowry/Coble Sale, Courtney
The Hound of the Baskervilles (m) 02/18/15 Wright/Pichette Amster, Peter
What I Learned in Paris (u) 03/17/15 Cleage, Pearle Bellamy, Lou
On Golden Pond (m) 04/14/15 Thompson, Ernest Allen, Janet

2013–2014 season

 The Crucible - Arthur Miller
 An Iliad - by Lisa Peterson and Denis O'Hare adapted from Homer translated by Robert Fagles
 A Christmas Carol - Charles Dickens
 and then they came for me: Remembering the World of Anne Frank - James Still
 Kurt Vonnegut's Who am I this Time?(& other conundrums of love) - Aaron Posner
 Other Desert Cities - Jon Robin Baitz
 The Mountaintop - Katori Hall
 Ken Ludwig's The Game's Afoot

2012–2013 season

 Dr. Jekyll & Mr. Hyde''' - Robert Louis Stevenson, adapted by Jeffrey Hatcher
 The Night Watcher - Charlayne Woodard
 The Syringa Tree - Pamela Gien
 The House That Jack Built - James Still
 Jackie and Me - Dan Gutman, adapted by Steven Dietz
 A Little Night Music - music and lyrics by Stephen Sondheim, book by Hugh Wheeler
 The Whipping Man - Matthew Lopez
 A Midsummer Night's Dream - William Shakespeare

2011–2012 season

 Dracula - Steven Dietz
 I Love to Eat - James Still
 Lost: A Memoir - Cathy Ostlere and Dennis Garnhum
 Nobody Don't Like Yogi - Tom Lysaght
 Julius Caesar - William Shakespeare
 A Christmas Carol - Charles Dickens, adapted by Tom Haas
 Radio Golf - August Wilson
 God of Carnage - Yasmina Reza
 Fallen Angels - Noël Coward
 The Miracle Worker - William Gibson

2010–2011 season

 Holes - Louis Sachar
 Mary's Wedding - Stephen Massicotte
 A Christmas Carol - Charles Dickens, adapted by Tom Haas
 The Diary of Anne Frank - Frances Goodrich and Albert Hackett, newly adapted by Wendy Kesselman
 Neat - Charlayne Woodard
 Fire in the Garden - Ken Weitzman
 In Acting Shakespeare - James DeVita
 The Gospel According to James - Charles Smith - World Premiere
 The 39 Steps - adapted by Patrick Barlow, original concept by Simon Corble and Nobby Dimon, based on the novel by James Buchan

2009–2010 season

 Love Letters - A.R. Gurney
 Romeo and Juliet - William Shakespeare
 A Christmas Carol - Charles Dickens
 Pretty Fire - Charlayne Woodard
 The Year of Magical Thinking - Joan Didion
 After Paul McCartney - David Hoppe
 Becky's New Car - Steven Dietz
 Around the World in 80 Days - Jules Verne, adapted by Mark Brown
 The Heavens are Hung In Black - James Still
 The Giver - book by Lois Lowry, adapted by Eric Coble

2009–2008 season

 Sherlock Holmes: The Final Adventure - adapted by Steven Dietz, based on the original 1899 play by Sir Arthur Conan Doyle
 Macbeth - William Shakespeare
 A Christmas Carol - Charles Dickens, adapted by Tom Haas
 This Wonderful Life - written by Steve Murray, conceived by Mark Setlock
 To Kill A Mockingbird - Harper Lee, adapted by Christopher Sergel
 Crime and Punishment - Fyodor Dostoevsky, adapted by Marilyn Campbell and Curt Columbus
 The Ladies Man - Georges Feydeau
 Crowns - Regina Taylor, adapted from the book by Michael Cunningham and Craig Marberry
 Rabbit Hole - David Lindsay-Abaire
 Interpreting William'' - James Still

References

External links
 Indiana Repertory Theatre official site

League of Resident Theatres
Theatres in Indiana
Buildings and structures in Indianapolis
Tourist attractions in Indianapolis